The Wilburn House is a historic house at 707 East Race Street in Searcy, Arkansas.  It is a single-story wood-frame structure, with a side gable roof, weatherboard siding, and a brick foundation.  It has a projecting gabled entry porch, with a broad frieze and fully pedimented gable supported by square columns with molded capitals.  Built about 1875, it is one of Searcy's finest surviving pre-railroad houses.

The house was listed on the National Register of Historic Places in 1991.

See also
National Register of Historic Places listings in White County, Arkansas

References

Houses on the National Register of Historic Places in Arkansas
Greek Revival architecture in Arkansas
Houses completed in 1875
Houses in Searcy, Arkansas
National Register of Historic Places in Searcy, Arkansas
1875 establishments in Arkansas